The 2012 Wichita Wild season was the team's sixth season as a professional indoor football franchise and fourth in the Indoor Football League (IFL). One of sixteen teams competing in the IFL for the 2012 season, the Park City, Kansas-based Wichita Wild were members of the Intense Conference.

Under the leadership of head coach Paco Martinez, the team played their home games at the Hartman Arena in Park City, Kansas.

Schedule
Key:

Regular season
All start times are local time

Postseason

Roster

Standings

References

Wichita Wild
Wichita Wild
Wichita Wild